Joseph W. Holden (1844–1875) was a North Carolina politician in the nineteenth century.  He was the son of William Woods Holden.

During the American Civil War, Holden served in the Confederate States Army and was captured by Union forces at Roanoke Island.  In 1865, his father handed over to him the editorship of the North Carolina Standard.

A Republican, he was elected in 1868 to the North Carolina House of Representatives from Wake County.  Holden served as Speaker of the North Carolina House of Representatives while his party controlled the state legislature in 1868-1870, but he resigned before the end of his term. In 1868, Holden was also a delegate to the Republican National Convention.  In 1870, Holden lost a close race in a special election to the United States House of Representatives, the result of which he unsuccessfully contested.

In 1874-1875, he served as mayor of Raleigh, North Carolina. Called "one of the most talented men that the State has ever produced" by a local historian, Holden, who was also a noted poet. He died at age 31 in 1875.

See also
North Carolina General Assembly of 1868–1869

References

Mayors of Raleigh, North Carolina
Republican Party members of the North Carolina House of Representatives
Poets from North Carolina
1844 births
1875 deaths
Holden family
Speakers of the North Carolina House of Representatives
People of North Carolina in the American Civil War
19th-century American poets
American male poets
19th-century American male writers
19th-century American politicians